The Governor of Yaroslavl Oblast is the highest official of Yaroslavl Oblast. The oblast government is headed by the chairman of the government of Yaroslavl Oblast, a post separated from that of the governor in 2012.

The position of governor was established on 3 December 1991. Currently the governor is elected by direct election for a five-year term.

The fourth governor Dmitry Mironov was elected in the elections on 10 September 2017.

List of governors

Notes 

 
Yaroslavl
Politics of Yaroslavl Oblast